Electricity Act may refer to:

Acts of the Parliament of the United Kingdom:

Electric Lighting Acts 1882 to 1909 
Electric Lighting (Scotland Act) 1890
Electric Lighting (Scotland Act) 1902
 Electricity (Supply) Act 1919
 Electricity (Supply) Act 1922
 Electricity (Supply) Act 1926
 Electricity (Supply) Act 1928
 Electricity (Supply) Act (Northern Ireland) 1931
 Electricity (Supply) Act 1933
 Electricity (Supply) Act 1935
 Electricity Supply (Meters) Act 1936

Electricity Act 1947
Electricity (Supply) Act (Northern Ireland) 1948
Electricity Supply (Meters) Act 1952
Electricity Reorganisation (Scotland Act) 1954
Electricity Act 1957, repealed 1989
Electricity (Borrowing Powers) Act 1959
Electricity (Amendment) Act 1961
Electricity and Gas Act 1963
Gas and Electricity Act 1968
Electricity Act 1972
Electricity (Scotland) Act 1979
Electricity (Financial Provisions) (Scotland) Act 1988
Electricity Act 1989, replacing the 1957 Act
Acts of the Parliament of India

The Electricity Act, 2003

See also
Energy law